Cazalot is a surname. Notable people with the surname include:

Clarence P. Cazalot Jr. (born 1950), American energy industry executive
Florian Cazalot (born 1985), French rugby union player

See also
Cazalet